Edwin ("Ted") James Tyler (13 October 1864 in Kidderminster, Worcestershire, England – 25 January 1917 in North Town, Taunton, Somerset, England) was a cricketer who played first-class cricket for Somerset County Cricket Club between 1891 and 1907. Tyler also played one Test match for England on their tour to South Africa in 1895–96.

Tyler was a left-handed bowler.  He played much of his early cricket for the Kidderminster Club, and for two years, 1885 and 1886, he was in the Worcestershire eleven, bowling with success in 1885. Then came his connection with Somerset and his fame as a slow bowler.

References

External links
 
 
 Obituary of Ted Tyler from the 1918 Wisden Cricketers' Almanack, this obituary is now out of copyright and much of this article is based on this obituary.

1864 births
1917 deaths
England Test cricketers
English cricketers
Somerset cricketers
Sportspeople from Kidderminster
West of England cricketers
Players cricketers
North v South cricketers
Cricketers who have taken ten wickets in an innings
Lord Hawke's XI cricketers